The Indianapolis 500 (also called the Indianapolis 500-Mile Race) is a  American open-wheel car race held annually on American Memorial Day weekend at the Indianapolis Motor Speedway (IMS), in Speedway, Indiana. It was first held in 1911 as the International 500-Mile Sweepstakes Race, after IMS founders James A. Allison, Carl G. Fisher, Arthur C. Newby and Frank H. Wheeler decided to experiment with a long-distance auto race. In 1919 it was renamed the Liberty Sweepstakes and reverted to its original name, the International 500-Mile Sweepstakes Race, from 1920 to 1980. Between 1911 and 1955, the race was run by the American Automobile Association, then by the United States Auto Club from 1956 to 1997, and finally by the Indy Racing League/IndyCar beginning in 1998. Each winning racer and team is presented with a small replica of the Art Deco sterling silver Borg-Warner Trophy, a large sum of money, and a championship ring as prizes for winning the race. 

In the 106 editions of the Indianapolis 500 that have occurred as of the 2022 event, 74 different drivers have won. Hélio Castroneves, A. J. Foyt, Rick Mears, and Al Unser share the record for the most victories with four each. The first winner in 1911 was American racer Ray Harroun, and the most recent victor is Swedish driver Marcus Ericsson in 2022. It has been won by drivers from 12 different countries. 52 American drivers have won 74 editions of the race, while only one winner has come from seven other nations. In the races in 1924 and 1941, two drivers sharing a car were declared joint winners. Troy Ruttman and Unser are the youngest and oldest Indianapolis 500 winners, winning at the ages of 22 years and 80 days in 1952 and 47 years and 360 days in 1987, respectively. Team Penske has won the most races as a car entrant with 18 since their first in 1972.

By year

By driver

By driver nationality

By team

By car make

By engine manufacturer

By tire make

Notes

References

External links
 

 
Winners